Manchi Rojulochaie is a 2021 Indian Telugu-language romantic comedy film written and directed by Maruthi. Produced by UV Concepts (under V Celluloid) and SKN (under Mass Movie Makers), the film starred Santosh Sobhan, Mehreen Pirzada and Ajay Ghosh. Manchi Rojulochaie was released on 4 November 2021, coincinding with the festival of Diwali.

Plot 
Santosh (Santosh Sobhan) and Paddu (Mehreen) are in love and they had to move to their native locations from Bengaluru, due to work-from-home during the early Covid times. Gopalam (Ajay Ghosh) is the father of Paddu, who gets influenced by his friends Moorthy and Koti, starts getting worried about his daughter's love affair. Later his worry turns complicated and he starts getting scared of death. How Santhosh tries and solves all the troubles of Gopalam is the story

Cast 

 Santosh Sobhan as Santosh "Santu"
 Mehreen Pirzada as Padma "Paddhu" Tirumalasetty
 Ajay Ghosh as Tirumalasetty "Gundu" Gopalam, father of Padma
 Vennela Kishore as Doctor Bava
 Srinivasa Reddy as Broker Srinivas
Srinivas as Policy Murthy
 Harsha Chemudu as Banda Babu
 Saptagiri as Ambulance Anand
 Rajitha as Gayyali Pellam
 Praveen as Linga Babu
 Satyam Rajesh as Intipakka CI
Koteswara Rao as Pakkinti Koti
Sudarshan as Nellore Bammardhi
Raccha Ravi as Cab driver
Jabardasth Dorababu
Jabardasth Sathipandu
Hemanth

Soundtrack

Release 
Manchi Rojulochaie was shot in one month while director Maruthi was on a brief break from shooting his other film Pakka Commercial. The film is Maruthi's first collaboration with Santosh Sobhan, and second collaboration with Mehreen Pirzada. In October 2021, the film's release date was announced as 4 November 2021, coinciding with Deepavali.

Reception 
Sravan Vanaparthy of The Times of India gave a rating of 2.5 out of 5 and wrote that "In Manchi Rojulochaie, director Maruthi focuses on societal issues and showcases how a parent would rather believe his gossip-mongering neighbours instead of his own child". Y Sunita Chowdhary of The Hindu opined that the film made a mawkish take on parenthood. She stated: "Though Maruthi chose a nice concept about living in fear, he seems to have lost the balance by creating excessive jokes around a sentiment." Writing for The New Indian Express, Murali Krishna Ch wrote − "Maruthi deserves the credit for delivering straight yet sharp dialogues about life. On the whole, Manchi Rojulochaie is an enjoyable festive entertainer, elevated by its remarkable performances and sharp dialogues". The Hans India rated the film 3 out of 5, praising the performances of lead actors and appreciating Maruthi's work. Mukesh Manjunath of Film Companion wrote, "The film, directed by Maruthi, can't wait to crack jokes and then sprint to the emotional beats."

References

External links 

 
 

2021 films
2020s Telugu-language films
2021 comedy-drama films
2021 romantic comedy films
Indian romantic comedy-drama films
Films shot in Hyderabad, India
Films set in Hyderabad, India
Films directed by Maruthi